Wixon Valley is a city in Brazos County, Texas, United States. The population was 254 at the 2010 census. It is part of the Bryan-College Station metropolitan area.

Geography

Wixon Valley is located in north-central Brazos County at  (30.761566, –96.322682), along U.S. Route 190 and extending to the northwest.

Demographics

As of the census of 2000, there were 235 people, 85 households, and 70 families residing in the city. The population density was 131.0 people per square mile (50.7/km). There were 88 housing units at an average density of 49.1 per square mile (19.0/km). The racial makeup of the city was 91.06% White, 7.66% African American, 0.43% from other races, and 0.85% from two or more races. Hispanic or Latino of any race were 2.55% of the population.

There were 85 households, out of which 34.1% had children under the age of 18 living with them, 68.2% were married couples living together, 15.3% had a female householder with no husband present, and 16.5% were non-families. 12.9% of all households were made up of individuals, and 9.4% had someone living alone who was 65 years of age or older. The average household size was 2.76 and the average family size was 3.03.

In the city, the population was spread out, with 30.2% under the age of 18, 6.4% from 18 to 24, 28.9% from 25 to 44, 19.6% from 45 to 64, and 14.9% who were 65 years of age or older. The median age was 36 years. For every 100 females, there were 85.0 males. For every 100 females age 18 and over, there were 76.3 males.

The median income for a household in the city was $53,750, and the median income for a family was $59,063. Males had a median income of $35,417 versus $25,938 for females. The per capita income for the city was $33,915. None of the families and 3.0% of the population were living below the poverty line, including no under eighteens and 6.5% of those over 64.

Education
Wixon Valley is served by  Bryan Independent School District (BISD).

Wixon Valley is split between the zones of Houston Elementary School and Bonham Elementary School. Bilingual students zoned to Bonham attend Bonham while bilingual students zoned to Houston attend Henderson Elementary School. All students are zoned to: Rayburn Intermediate School, Davila Middle School, and Rudder High School.

References

Cities in Brazos County, Texas
Cities in Texas
Bryan–College Station